Alen or aln is a traditional Scandinavian unit of distance similar to the north German elle: roughly 60 centimeters. The Danish alen, also used in Norway, was equal to 62.77 centimeters (2 Danish fod). The Swedish aln was 59.38 centimeters.

References

For a full list of old Danish measures, and their metric equivalents, see this Danish website.

Units of length
Obsolete units of measurement